Il solco di pesca (translates in English to "The Furrow of the Peach" although often mis-translated as "Groove Fishing" or "Fishing Hole" due to the word "pesca" ("peach" in Italian) is "fishing" in Spanish)) is a 1976 Italian erotic-drama film  directed by Maurizio Liverani. It concerns a photographer (Davide) obsessed with women's posteriors who, while carrying on an affair with the married Viviane finds her maid Tonina (played by Gloria Guida) to have a younger, more inspiring "peach." Davide consults his Uncle, a priest at the local church, which introduces casual discussions of Catholic guilt and the role of sin in the home to what might otherwise be a light sex comedy.

Cast 
 Martine Brochard as Viviane 
 Gloria Guida as  Tonina 
  Alberto Terracina as Davide 
  Diego Ghiglia as  Husband of Viviane  
 Emilio Cigoli as  Uncle of Davide

See also 
 
 List of Italian films of 1976

References

External links

1976 films
1970s erotic drama films
Italian erotic drama films
1976 drama films
1970s Italian-language films
1970s Italian films